Rose bengal (4,5,6,7-tetrachloro-2',4',5',7'-tetraiodofluorescein) is a stain.  Rose bengal belongs to the class of organic compounds called xanthenes.  Its sodium salt is commonly used in eye drops to stain damaged conjunctival and corneal cells and thereby identify damage to the eye. The stain is also used in the preparation of Foraminifera for microscopic analysis, allowing the distinction between forms that were alive or dead at the time of collection.

A form of rose bengal is also being studied as a treatment for certain cancers and skin conditions. The cancer formulation of the drug, known as PV-10, is currently undergoing clinical trials for melanoma, breast cancer. and neuroendocrine tumors.  The company also has formulated a drug based on rose bengal for the treatment of eczema and psoriasis; this drug, PV-10, is currently in clinical trials as well.

History and etymology
Rose bengal was originally prepared in 1882 by Swiss chemist Robert Ghnem, as an analogue of fluorescein. Rudolf Nietzki at the University of Basel identified the principal constituents of rose bengal as iodine derivatives of di- and tetra-chlorofluorescein. The compound was originally used as a wool dye. Its name derives from rose (flower) and Bengal (region); it is printed as rose bengal or Rose Bengal in the scientific literature.

Chemical applications 

Despite its complicated photochemistry involving several species, rose bengal is also used in synthetic chemistry to generate singlet oxygen from triplet oxygen.  The singlet oxygen can then undergo a variety of useful reactions, particularly [2 + 2] cycloadditions with alkenes and similar systems.

Derivatives and salts
Rose bengal can be used to form many derivatives that have important medical functions.  One such derivative was created so to be sonosensitive but photoinsensitive, so that with a high intensity focused ultrasound, it could be used in the treatment of cancer.  The derivative was formed by amidation of rose bengal, which turned off the fluorescent and photosensitive properties of rose bengal, leading to a usable compound, named in the study as RB2.

Salts of rose bengal include C20H4Cl4I4O5·2Na (CAS 632-69-9). This sodium salt is a dye, which has its own unique properties and uses.

Biological applications 

PV-10 (an injectable form of rose bengal) was found to cause an observable response in 60% of tumors treated, according to researchers in a phase II melanoma study. Locoregional disease control was observed in 75% of patients. Also confirmed was a "bystander effect", previously observed in the phase I trial, whereby untreated lesions responded to treatment as well, potentially due to immune system response. These data were based on the interim results (in 2009) of the first 40 patients treated in an 80-patient study.  a phase-3 study of PV-10 as a single agent therapy for patients with locally advanced cutaneous melanoma (Clinical Trials ID NCT02288897) is enrolling patients.

Rose bengal has been shown to not just prevent the growth and spread of ovarian cancer, but also to cause apoptotic cell death of the cancer cells. This has been proven in vitro, in order to prove that rose bengal is still a possible option in the treatment of cancer, and further research should be done.

Rose bengal has been used to treat colon cancer. In one such study, a protective immune response was generated from immunogenic cell death.

Rose bengal is also used in animal models of ischemic stroke (photothrombotic stroke models) in biomedical research. A bolus of the compound is injected into the venous system. Then the region of interest (e.g., the cerebral cortex) is exposed and illuminated by LASER light of 561 nm. A thrombus is formed in the illuminated blood vessels, causing a stroke in the dependent brain tissue.

Rose bengal has been used for 50 years to diagnose liver and eye cancer. Rose bengal dye is mixed with the homogenate of Brucella and pH of the solution is maintained at 3.8, and this dye is used to diagnose Brucellosis by agglutinating the suspected serum. Rose bengal is slightly irritating and toxic to the eye. It has also been used as an insecticide.

Rose bengal is able to stain cells whenever the surface epithelium is not being properly protected by the preocular tear film, because rose bengal has been proven to not be able to stain cells because of the protective functioning of these preocular tear films. This is why rose bengal is often useful as a stain in diagnosing certain medical issues, such as conjunctival and lid disorders.

Rose bengal has been used for ocular surface staining to study the efficacy of punctal plugs in the treatment of keratoconjunctivitis sicca.

Rose bengal is being researched as an agent in creating nano sutures. Wounds are painted on both sides with it and then illuminated with an intense light. This links the tiny collagen fibers together sealing the wound. Healing is faster and the seal reduces chances of infection.

Rose bengal is used to suppress bacterial growth in several microbiological media, including Cooke's rose bengal agar.

Rose bengal has been used as a protoplasm stain to discriminate between living and dead micro-organisms, particularly Foraminifera, since the 1950s when Bill Walton developed the technique.

Rose bengal acetate can act as a photosensitiser and may have potential in photodynamic therapy to treat some cancers.

References

External links
 
 Absorption and extinction data 

Ophthalmology
Triarylmethane dyes
Phenols
Chloroarenes
Iodoarenes
Spiro compounds
VMAT inhibitors
Acid dyes